Brass Tacks or brass tacks may refer to:

Film and television
 Brass Tacks (UK TV programme), a 1977–1988 British documentary programme that aired on BBC
 Brass Tacks (Pakistani TV program), a Pakistani defense and political program

Music
 Brass Tacks (album), an album by the rock band NRBQ
 Brass Tacks Records, a subsidiary of DRT Entertainment

Other uses
 Brass tack, a type of drawing pin
 Operation Brasstacks, a 1986–1987 military exercise by the Indian Army